Abdoulaye Seck (born 10 March 1988 in Dakar) is a Senegalese footballer who plays as a full back.

Career
Seck began his professional career in Niary Tally. In January 2011, he was moved to Belgian Pro League giants R.S.C. Anderlecht. He then made his debut on new club on 3 April 2011, acting as a starter in a 1-3 home defeat against Standard Liège, in the Jupiler League Playoffs.

In July 2011, Seck was loaned to FC Brussels, on a season-long loan.

References

External links
 RSC Anderlecht Official Profile
 Ablaye Seck at Footballdatabase

1988 births
Living people
Senegalese footballers
Senegalese expatriate footballers
ASC Niarry Tally players
R.S.C. Anderlecht players
R.W.D.M. Brussels F.C. players
Belgian Pro League players
Challenger Pro League players
Expatriate footballers in Belgium
Senegalese expatriate sportspeople in Belgium
Association football fullbacks